Mytilodiscus is a genus of fungi in the family Helotiaceae. This is a monotypic genus, containing the single species Mytilodiscus alnicola.

References

Helotiaceae
Monotypic Ascomycota genera